Dan Růžička (born December 31, 1991) is a Czech professional ice hockey defenceman. He played with HC Plzeň in the Czech Extraliga during the 2010–11 Czech Extraliga season.

References

External links

1991 births
Living people
Czech ice hockey defencemen
HC Plzeň players
HC Slovan Ústečtí Lvi players
Motor České Budějovice players